Russell William Lutz (born September 14, 1968) is an American science fiction author.  His work has appeared in several books, webzines, and magazines, including Byzarium, The SiNK, scifantastic, and anotherealm. He won the 2005 SFFWorld First Place prize for short fiction for the short story "Fall".  His first novel, Iota Cycle, was published in 2006 and received an Honorable Mention at the New York Book Festival Awards, his second, The Department of Off World Affairs, in September 2008.

Lutz was born in Illinois.  He moved with his family to Fort Worth, Texas, where he attended Fort Worth Country Day School.  He earned a Bachelor of Science in mathematics from Texas A&M University and a master's degree in mathematics from the University of Texas at Austin.

Lutz lives in Fort Worth, Texas.

Bibliography

Novels

 2008 The Department of Off World Affairs
 2006 Iota Cycle—Winner, 2006 DIY Festival (Science Fiction); Honorable Mention, 2007 New York Book Festival

Short fiction

 2005 The Faeries in the Front Garden
 2005 Night Trial
 2005 The Abduction
 2005 The Hill, published in the anthology, Thank You, Death Robot
 2005 Two and a Half
 2005 Athens 3004, published in the award-winning anthology, Silverthought: Ignition
 2004 The Last Perfect Afternoon
 2004 Tragedy at 12:02
 2004 Summer
 2004 Sitting on the Dock

References

External links
 Silverthought Press

21st-century American novelists
American male novelists
American people of German descent
American science fiction writers
People from Fort Worth, Texas
Novelists from Texas
Living people
1968 births
American male short story writers
21st-century American short story writers
21st-century American male writers